Chandrasekharan Nair Stadium is a prominent football stadium situated in Thiruvananthapuram, Kerala, India. The stadium, also known as 'Police Stadium' and the stadium  was constructed in honor of the first Inspector-general of police of  Kerala Shri.N.Chandrasekharan Nair in 1956. The stadium was renovated its existing football ground including clearing and re arranging drains, rearranging the playing arena to accommodate new 6 lane synthetic track, dismantling and renovating the spectator steps as per necessity, turfing, new chain link fencing to the track, provision of structure for score board etc. for 35th National Games.

References

External links

Football venues in Kerala
Sports venues in Thiruvananthapuram
Football in Kerala
1956 establishments in Kerala
Sports venues completed in 1956
Kerala Police
20th-century architecture in India